Fanatics is a 1917 American silent drama film directed by Raymond Wells and starring Adda Gleason, J. Barney Sherry and William V. Mong. It was one of a number of films made about coal mining conflicts during the silent era.

Cast
 Adda Gleason as Mary Lathrop
 J. Barney Sherry as Nicholas Eyre
 William V. Mong as Hugh Groesbeck
 Don Fuller as Robert Lathrop 
 Olga Grey as Lola Monroe
 Eugene Burr as Billy Haskell
 Edward Hayden as Eyre's Clerk
 Will Jeffries as Foreman

References

Bibliography
 Ross, Steven J. Working-Class Hollywood: Silent Film and the Shaping of Class in America. Princeton University Press, 2020.

External links
 

1917 films
1917 drama films
1910s English-language films
American silent feature films
Silent American drama films
American black-and-white films
Triangle Film Corporation films
Films directed by Raymond Wells
1910s American films